Elizabeth Taylor Greenfield (1809 – March 31, 1876), dubbed "The Black Swan" (a play on Jenny Lind's sobriquet, "The Swedish Nightingale), was an American singer considered the best-known black concert artist of her time. She was lauded by James M. Trotter for her "remarkably sweet tones and wide vocal compass".

Biography
Greenfield was born into slavery in Natchez, Mississippi sometime between 1817 and 1826, to Anna Greenfield and a man whose name may have been "Taylor." According to an 1854 article in The Tri-Weekly Commercial, "her mother was of Indian descent, her father an African." 

In the early 1820s, Greenfield's mistress, Elizabeth H. Greenfield, a former plantation owner, moved to Philadelphia after divorcing her second husband and emancipated her slaves. E.H. Greenfield worked with the American Emancipation Society to send 18 formerly enslaved residents of the Greenfield plantation, including Anna Greenfield and two of her daughters, to Liberia on August 2, 1831, aboard the brig Criterion. Greenfield remained in Philadelphia. She studied music as a child, although musical education was not generally provided by the Quakers with whom she associated. (While some sources state that E.H. Greenfield was herself a Quaker, others state only that she attended Quaker meetings "occasionally" and supported the Society of Friends financially.)

In about 1851, Greenfield began to sing at private parties, debuting at the Buffalo Musical Association. From 1851 to 1853 she toured as managed by Colonel J. H. Wood, a P. T. Barnum-style promoter and supporter of the Fugitive Slave Act of 1850, who would not allow black patrons into her concerts.

In 1853, Greenfield debuted at Metropolitan Hall in New York City, which held an audience of 4,000—white patrons only. After the concert, Greenfield apologized to her own people for their exclusion from the performance and gave a concert to benefit the Home of Aged Colored Persons and the Colored Orphan Asylum.

In April 1853, she went to London under the patronage of the Duchess of Sutherland and Harriet Beecher Stowe. Greenfield was taught by Queen Victoria's Chapel Royal organist, George Thomas Smart. She gave a command performance for the queen at Buckingham Palace on May 10, 1854; she was the first African American performer to perform before British royalty. Harriet Beecher Stowe wrote about Greenfield's appearance before the "elite" English society in "Sunny Memories of Foreign Lands" In England, she also received patronage from the Duchess of Norfolk and the Duchess of Argyle.

Best known for her performances of the music of George Frideric Handel, Wolfgang Amadeus Mozart, Gioachino Rossini, Giacomo Meyerbeer, Vincenzo Bellini, and Gaetano Donizetti, she also performed sentimental American songs such as Henry Bishop's 1852 setting of John Howard Payne's "Home! Sweet Home!" and Stephen Foster's "Old Folks at Home".

Returning to the United States, she toured and conducted a Philadelphia music studio. Among her voice pupils was Thomas Bowers, who became known as "The Colored Mario" and "The American Mario" for the similarity of his voice to Italian opera tenor Giovanni Mario. In the 1860s she created an opera troupe with Bowers which she directed. Greenfield died in Philadelphia of paralysis on March 31, 1876. She was a member of the Philadelphia Shiloh Baptist Church.

References

Further reading
 Blakemore, Erin. “Elizabeth Taylor Greenfield, ‘The Black Swan.’” Daily JSTOR, JSTOR, 6 May 2019.
Chybowski, Julia J. "Becoming the “Black Swan” in Mid-Nineteenth-Century America: Elizabeth Taylor Greenfield's Early Life and Debut Concert Tour." Journal of the American Musicological Society 67.1 (2014): 125–165.
LaBrew, Arthur. The Black Swan: Elizabeth T. Greenfield, songstress: biographical study. Detroit, MI: [s.n.], 1969
Lott, Eric. Love and Theft: Blackface Minstrelsy and the American Working Class. New York: Oxford University Press, 1993. .
 Southern, Eileen. The Music of Black Americans: A History. W. W. Norton & Company; 3rd edition. 
3 Hine, Darlene Clark. Black Women in America: an historical Encyclopedia. Brooklyn, NY: Carlson Publishing, 1993. pp 499–501.

External links
 The Black Swan at Home and Abroad; A Biographical Sketch of Miss Elizabeth Taylor Greenfield,                   The American Vocalist. @ Gutenberg.org

1824 births
1876 deaths
19th-century American slaves
19th-century African-American women singers
19th-century American women opera singers
African-American women opera singers
Musicians from Natchez, Mississippi
Musicians from Philadelphia
Singers from Mississippi
Singers from Pennsylvania
Classical musicians from Pennsylvania